Jawaharlal Nehru Krishi Vishwa Vidyalaya (JNKVV), also Jawaharlal Nehru Agricultural University, is a public university in Jabalpur, Madhya Pradesh, India specializing in the field of agriculture. It is recognized and accredited by University Grants Commission (UGC) and Indian Council of Agricultural Research (ICAR).

Faculties
The university is mainly in two faculties:

 Faculty of Agriculture
 Department of Agronomy 
 Department of Soil science
 Department of Horticulture (Fruit & Vegetable science)
 Department of Entomology
 Department of Plant Pathology
 Department of Plant Physiology
 Department of Agricultural Extension Education 
 Department of Agricultural Economics
 Department of Agricultural Forestry
 Faculty of Agricultural Engineering
 Department of Agricultural Structure and Environmental Engineering
 Department of Applied Physics and Agriculture Meteorology
 Department of Farm Machinery and Power
 Department of Post Harvest Process and Food Engineering
 Department of Soil and Water Engineering
 Instrument Development and Service Center

References

External links
 

Agricultural universities and colleges in Madhya Pradesh
Monuments and memorials to Jawaharlal Nehru
Education in Jabalpur
Educational institutions established in 1964
1964 establishments in India